Libatse is a settlement in Põhja-Pärnumaa Parish, Pärnu County in western Estonia.

References 

Villages in Pärnu County